Retrospective II: 1981 to 1987 is a compilation album by Canadian rock band Rush, released in 1997 (see 1997 in music). The album features songs from the second decade of the band.

This compilation album is now disc two of the 2006 Rush compilation album Gold.

Track listing

Personnel 
Geddy Lee    – bass guitars, synthesizers, vocals
Alex Lifeson – electric and acoustic guitars, synthesizers
Neil Peart   – drums, percussion, electronic percussion, lyricist

See also 
 Retrospective I
 Gold
 Retrospective III: 1989–2008

References

1997 compilation albums
Anthem Records compilation albums
Rush (band) compilation albums
Mercury Records compilation albums